Oberhausen-Rheinhausen is a municipality in Northern Karlsruhe district in Baden-Württemberg, Germany.

References

External links
 Konvoi der Hoffnung e. V. Hilfsorganisation (aid organisation)

Karlsruhe (district)